El Comisario de Tranco Largo is a 1942 Argentine film.

Cast

 Alí Salem de Baraja - José Julián Califa
 Mario Baroffio - Don Ramiro
 Isabel Figlioli
 Ada Méndez
 Pepito Petray
 Pedro Maratea - Aniceto Vargas
 Claudio Martino
 Lydia Quintana - Luciana
 Susana Campos
 Antonio Capuano
 Marino Seré
 Joaquín Petrosino - Sargent

External links
 

1942 films
1940s Spanish-language films
Argentine black-and-white films
1942 comedy films
Argentine comedy films
1940s Argentine films
Films directed by Leopoldo Torres Ríos